Beacon Hotel may refer to:
Beacon Hotel, in Sandyford, Dublin
Hotel Beacon on the Upper West Side of Manhattan